The canton of Faverges-Seythenex (before 2021: Faverges) is an administrative division of the Haute-Savoie department, southeastern France. Its borders were modified at the French canton reorganisation which came into effect in March 2015. Its seat is in Faverges-Seythenex.

It consists of the following communes:

Alex
La Balme-de-Thuy
Bluffy
Le Bouchet-Mont-Charvin
Chevaline
Les Clefs
La Clusaz
Dingy-Saint-Clair
Doussard
Faverges-Seythenex
Giez
Glières-Val-de-Borne (partly)
Le Grand-Bornand
Lathuile
Manigod
Menthon-Saint-Bernard
Saint-Ferréol
Saint-Jean-de-Sixt
Serraval
Talloires-Montmin
Thônes
Val-de-Chaise
Veyrier-du-Lac
Les Villards-sur-Thônes

References

Cantons of Haute-Savoie